Roaring Lions at Home is a 1924 short comedy film directed by American director Benjamin Stoloff. It was released by Fox Film and starred Oliver Hardy.

References

External links
 

1924 comedy films
1924 films
American silent short films
American black-and-white films
Films directed by Benjamin Stoloff
1924 short films
Silent American comedy films
American comedy short films
1920s American films